Jared Wayne Moon (born April 4, 1971) is an American baseball coach and former catcher. He played college baseball at Houston Baptist for coaches Rickey Witt & Rusty Pendergrass from 1990 to 1994. He was also the head coach of the Houston Baptist Huskies (2006–2021)

Early life
Moon attended Aldine High School in Houston, Texas. Moon played for the school's varsity baseball team. Moon then enrolled at  Houston Baptist University, where he played for the Houston Baptist Huskies baseball team as an catcher.

Coaching career
Upon graduation, Moon was named an assistant at Houston Baptist. After 11 seasons as an assistant, he was promoted to head coach when Brian Huddleston retired. In their final season in the National Association of Intercollegiate Athletics (NAIA), the Huskies advanced to the NAIA World Series, where they finished third. He led the Huskies to their first NCAA Division I baseball tournament championship in 2013, winning the Great West Conference. Two years after moving to the Southland Conference, he guided the Huskies to their first ever NCAA Division I Baseball Tournament appearance. The following spring he was rewarded with a contract extension. On May 27, 2021, Moon stepped down as the head coach of the Huskies.

Head coaching record

References

External links
Jared Moon, Head Baseball Coach, Houston Baptist University Huskies

Living people
1971 births
Baseball catchers
Houston Christian Huskies baseball players
Houston Christian Huskies baseball coaches